Michael John Morgan FRS (born 25 August 1942 in Cardiff, Wales) is a professor at City, University of London.. His area of research is the experimental psychology of vision, from neuroanatomy to perception and psychophysics.  He was educated in Cowbridge Grammar School and Queens' College, Cambridge. He was elected a Fellow of the Royal Society in 2005.  He is married to the biologist Linda Partridge FRS.

His 2001 book The Space Between Our Ears was the winner of the Wellcome Trust Book Prize before the prize was discontinued (and re-inaugurated in 2009 as a prize for medical writing). He is also the author of "Molyneux's Question" (Cambridge University Press), a book about the philosophy and psychology of recovery from early blindness.

External links 
 City University Home Page, including download links to Journal Articles
 UCL Institute of Cognitive Neuroscience
 Google Scholar Citations
Molyneux's Question

1942 births
Living people
Fellows of the Royal Society
Fellows of Queens' College, Cambridge